Derb-e Murgah (also Romanized as Derb-e Mūrgāh; also known as Mūrgā) is a village in Tashan-e Sharqi Rural District, Tashan District, Behbahan County, Khuzestan Province, Iran. At the 2006 census, its population was 43, in 10 families.

References 

Populated places in Behbahan County